Pierrette Ringuette (born December 31, 1955), also formerly known as Pierrette Ringuette-Maltais, is a Canadian Senator.

Ringuette, a businesswoman and professor, was the first francophone woman to be elected to the Legislative Assembly of New Brunswick. She sat in the body as a member of the New Brunswick Liberal Party beginning in 1987, and resigned her seat once she was elected as a Member of Parliament (MP). She was succeeded by her predecessor, Percy Mockler, in a provincial by-election in 1993.

In the 1993 federal election, she won a seat in the House of Commons of Canada as the Liberal MP for Madawaska—Victoria by defeating Progressive Conservative Cabinet Minister Bernard Valcourt.

She was defeated in the subsequent 1997 federal election, one of a number of Maritime Liberal MPs who lost their seats that year.

After her electoral defeat, she joined Canada Post Corporation in a senior position as manager of the international trade development unit.

On December 12, 2002, she was appointed to the Senate on the recommendation of Prime Minister Jean Chrétien.

On January 29, 2014, Liberal Party leader Justin Trudeau announced all Liberal Senators, including Ringuette, were removed from the Liberal caucus, and would continue sitting as Independents. The Senators referred to themselves as the Senate Liberal Caucus even though they are no longer members of the parliamentary Liberal caucus.

Ringuette announced, on February 2, 2016 that she was leaving the Senate Liberal caucus to sit as an Independent saying, in a statement, that "Canadians have been clear in their desire for a non-partisan Senate. The status quo is not acceptable."

She has a Bachelor of Arts from the University of Moncton and a Master of Business Administration from the University of Ottawa. She has completed the coursework for a Master of Industrial Relations.

Electoral record

Federal

|-
 
|Liberal
|Pierrette Ringuette
|align="right"|16,058
|align="right"|48.8
|align="right"|+5.0
|-
 
| style="width: 150px" |Progressive Conservative
|Bernard Valcourt
|align="right"|15,045
|align="right"|45.7
|align="right"|-2.5
|-

|-

|New Democratic Party
|Parise Martin
|align="right"|844
|align="right"|2.6
|align="right"|-5.4
|- bgcolor="white"
!align="left" colspan=3|Total
!align="right"|32,902
!align="right"|
!align="right"|

Provincial

References
Notes

Sources
Official biography on Parliament of Canada website
Personal senatorial website

External links
 

1955 births
Acadian people
Canadian senators from New Brunswick
Women members of the House of Commons of Canada
Women members of the Senate of Canada
Liberal Party of Canada MPs
Liberal Party of Canada senators
Independent Canadian senators
Living people
Members of the House of Commons of Canada from New Brunswick
New Brunswick Liberal Association MLAs
People from Edmundston
Université de Moncton alumni
University of Ottawa alumni
Women MLAs in New Brunswick
21st-century Canadian politicians
21st-century Canadian women politicians
Independent Senators Group